Guy Albert Marie Hénon (3 February 1912 – 19 July 1996) was a French field hockey player who competed in the 1936 Summer Olympics.

He was a member of the French field hockey team, which finished fourth in the 1936 Olympic tournament. He played two matches as halfback.

References

External links
 
part 6 the field hockey tournament
Guy Hénon's profile at Sports Reference.com

1912 births
1996 deaths
French male field hockey players
Olympic field hockey players of France
Field hockey players at the 1936 Summer Olympics
20th-century French people